Pankovskaya is a rural locality (a village) in Shapshinskoye Rural Settlement, Kharovsky District, Vologda Oblast, Russia. The population was 4 as of 2002.

Geography 
Pankovskaya is located 34 km northwest of Kharovsk (the district's administrative centre) by road. Tsiposhevskaya is the nearest rural locality.

References 

Rural localities in Kharovsky District